Mek We Dweet is a studio album by the Jamaican reggae singer Burning Spear, released in 1990 via Island Records. The recording sessions took place at Tuff Gong Recording Studio in Kingston. Burning Spear supported the album by touring with Reggae Sunsplash.

The album peaked at number 2 on the World Albums chart in the United States, and was nominated for a Grammy Award for Best Reggae Recording at the 33rd Annual Grammy Awards in 1991.

Critical reception

The Chicago Tribune wrote: "As Burning Spear looks to a future of justice and equality, he also envisions a music as modern, energetic and polished as anything young reggae lions like Ziggy Marley are doing today."

Track listing

Personnel
Winston Rodney – vocals, drums, producer, executive producer
Lenford Richard – piano, lead guitar, flute
Robert Lyn – piano, synthesizer
Lenval "Shayar" Jarrett – rhythm guitar
Paul Beckford – bass guitar
Nelson Miller – drums, producer
Alvin Haughton – percussion
Dean Ivanhoe Fraser – saxophone
David Robinson – saxophone (tracks: 3, 7)
Ronald "Nambo" Robinson – trombone
Charles Dickey – trombone (tracks: 3, 7)
Junior "Chico" Chin – trumpet
James Smith – trumpet (tracks: 3, 7)
Mervyn Williams – recording, mixing
Gary Sutherland – recording
Anthony Kelly – recording
Michel Sauvage – mixing
Garth Atkins – assistant recording
Danny Mormando – assistant mixing
Tony Dawsey – mastering
Mo Ström – cover design
Peter Hugh Dennis – illustration
Deborah Feingold – photography

Chart history

References

External links

Burning Spear albums
1990 albums
Island Records albums